This is a list of all known awards in Canada, conferred by either members of the royal family, viceroys, governments, or private organizations.

National awards

Royal awards in the federal jurisdiction

Viceregal awards in the federal jurisdiction

Military awards in the federal jurisdiction

Private awards in the federal jurisdiction

Provincial awards

Royal awards
 Vice-Regal Badge of Service (for all Lieutenant governors/territorial commissioners [gold] and all their spouses [silver])

Viceregal awards
 Vice-Regal and Commissioners' Commendation (presented by lieutenant governors and commissioners to recognise service to their respective offices)

Alberta

Royal awards in Alberta
 Royal Life Saving Awards
 Queen's Golden Jubilee Scholarships for the Visual and Performing Arts
 Queen's Golden Jubilee Citizenship Medal
 Queen Elizabeth II Graduate Scholarship Program

Viceregal awards in Alberta
 Institute of Public Administration — Lieutenant Governor Award
 Lieutenant Governor of Alberta Arts Awards Program
 Lieutenant Governor's Greenwing Conservation Award
 Lieutenant Governor's Leadership for Active Communities Award

British Columbia

Viceregal awards in British Columbia
 Vice-Regal and Commissioners Commendation Bar
 Lieutenant Governor's Daryl Duke Awards for Screenwriting
 Lieutenant Governor's Technology and Innovation Award
 Lieutenant Governor's Awards for Public Safety
 Lieutenant Governor's Conservation Award
 Lieutenant Governor's Awards for Excellence in British Columbia Wines
 Lieutenant Governor's Award for Literary Excellence
 Lieutenant Governor's Award for Engineering Excellence
 Lieutenant Governor's Silver Medal (University of Victoria)
 Lieutenant Governor of British Columbia Awards in Architecture
 Lieutenant Governor's Silver Medal for Excellence in Public Administration
 Lieutenant Governor's Medal for Historical Writing
 Lieutenant Governor's Silver Medal
 Lieutenant Governor's Trophy
 Lieutenant Governor's Handicap
 Lieutenant Governor's Prize
 Vice Regal Commendation

Manitoba

Royal awards in Manitoba
 Queen Elizabeth II Scholarship, Saint John's-Ravenscourt School, Winnipeg
 Queen Elizabeth II Silverwings Youth Scholarship

Viceregal awards in Manitoba
 Lieutenant Governor's Make a Difference Community Award
 Lieutenant Governor's Vice-Regal Volunteer Award
 Lieutenant Governor's Medal for Literacy
 Lieutenant Governor's Award for Excellence in Public Administration
 Lieutenant Governor's Award for Outstanding Contribution to the Community
 Lieutenant Governor of Manitoba Classroom Teacher Award (discontinued)
 Lieutenant Governor's Gold Medal (University of Manitoba, Degree Course in Agriculture)
 Lieutenant Governor's Gold Medal (University of Winnipeg, Bachelor of Arts (General) degree)
 Lieutenant Governor's Gold Medal (Brandon University)
 Lieutenant Governor's Silver Medals (Red River Community College, Diploma in Science Department, Diploma in Arts Department, Certificate in Science Department, Certificate in Arts Department)
 Lieutenant Governor's Silver Medals (Assiniboine Community College, Business Applied Arts Division,  Industrial Technical Division)
 Lieutenant Governor's Silver Medals (Keewatin Community College, Applied Studies Department, Trades and Technologies Department)
 Lieutenant Governor's Silver Medals (Keewatin Community College, academic or vocational program)
 Lieutenant Governor's Youth Experience Program
 Lieutenant Governor's Trophy for the Winnipeg Music Competition Festival
 Lieutenant Governor's Gold Medal for the Manitoba Provincial Rifle Association

New Brunswick

Royal awards in New Brunswick
 Queen Elizabeth II Scholarship

Viceregal awards in New Brunswick
 Lieutenant Governor's Prix Dialogue Award du lieutenant-gouverneur
 Lieutenant-Governor's Award for Excellence in Architecture
 Lieutenant-Governor's Award for Excellence in Public Administration
 Lieutenant-Governor's Prize for the Conservation of Wild Atlantic Salmon
 Lieutenant-Governor's Award for Youth in Action, Youth in Motion

Newfoundland and Labrador
Lieutenant Governor’s awards of Excellence in Architecture

Nova Scotia

Viceregal awards in Nova Scotia
 Vice-Regal and Commissioners Commendation Bar
 Lieutenant Governor of Nova Scotia Masterworks Arts Award
 Lieutenant Governor of Nova Scotia's Ready to Write/Prêt à Écrire Award
 Lieutenant Governor's Award for Conservation
 Lieutenant Governor's Award of Excellence in Engineering
 Lieutenant Governor's Award of Excellence in Public Administration
 Lieutenant Governor's Design Awards for Architecture
 Lieutenant Governor's Education Medal
 Lieutenant Governor's Greenwing Award
 Lieutenant Governor's Nova Scotia Talent Trust Award
 Lieutenant Governor's Princess Louise Fusiliers Award for Excellence
 Lieutenant Governor's Teaching Award
 Lieutenant Governor's Community Spirit Award
 Lieutenant Governor's Faith In Action Award
 Lieutenant Governor's Intergenerational Awards
 Lieutenant Governor's Community Voluntarism Award
 Lieutenant Governor's Persons with Disabilities Employer Partnership Award
 Lieutenant Governor's Hope and Inspiration Award
 Nova Scotia Talent Trust Award

Ontario

Royal awards in Ontario
 Queen Elizabeth II Scholarship
 Queen Elizabeth II Aiming for the Top Scholarship
 Ontario Golden Jubilee Award for Civilian Bravery
 Their Royal Highnesses The Duke and Duchess of Cambridge Award

Viceregal awards in Ontario
 Vice-Regal and Commissioners Commendation Bar
 Lieutenant Governor's Community Volunteer Award for Students
 Lieutenant Governor's Ontario Heritage Awards
 Lieutenant Governor's Award for Marketing Excellence in Ontario
 Lieutenant Governor's Literacy Pin
 Lieutenant Governor's Community Volunteer Award
 Lieutenant Governor's Award for Heritage
 Lieutenant Governor's Games Trophies, Award, and Medallions
 Lieutenant Governor's Medal of Distinction in Public Administration
 Lieutenant Governor's Cup
 Lieutenant Governor's Award for Excellence in Ontario Wines

Government awards in Ontario
 Amethyst Award for Outstanding Achievement by Ontario Public Servants
 Community Action Award
 Lincoln M. Alexander Award
 Ontario Volunteer Service Awards
 Outstanding Achievement Awards for Voluntarism in Ontario
 Senior Achievement Award
 Senior of the Year Award
 Trillium Book Award
 Ontario Medal for Young Volunteers

Quebec

Viceregal awards in Quebec
 Vice-Regal and Commissioners Commendation Bar
 Lieutenant Governor’s Youth Medal (bronze)
 Lieutenant Governor’s Seniors Medal (silver)
 Lieutenant Governor’s Medal for Exceptional Merit (gold)

Government awards in Quebec
 Prix du Québec; awarded by the government of Quebec to individuals for cultural and scientific achievements. Founded in 1977, the government annually awards six awards in the cultural field and five in the scientific field.

Cultural awards
 Prix Albert-Tessier
 Prix Athanase-David
 Prix Denise-Pelletier
 Prix Georges-Émile-Lapalme
 Prix Gérard-Morisset
 Prix Paul-Émile-Borduas

Scientific awards
 Prix Albert-Tessier
 Prix Armand-Frappier
 Prix Léon-Gérin
 Prix Lionel-Boulet
 Prix Marie-Victorin
 Prix Wilder-Penfield

Saskatchewan

Royal awards in Saskatchewan
 Prince Edward Drama Scholarship
 Prince of Wales Scholarship
 Queen Elizabeth II Centennial Aboriginal Scholarship
 Queen Elizabeth II Scholarship
 Queen Elizabeth II Scholarship in Parliamentary Studies

Viceregal awards in Saskatchewan
 Vice-Regal and Commissioners Commendation Bar
 Canadian Cancer Society, Saskatchewan Division, Lieutenant Governor's Award of Distinction
 Heritage Canada Foundation Lieutenant Governor's Award
 Institute of Public Administration of Canada Lieutenant Governor's Medal
 Lieutenant Governor of Saskatchewan Heritage Architecture Excellence Award
 Lieutenant Governor of Saskatchewan Meritorious Achievement Award
 Lieutenant Governor's Award for Lifetime Achievement in the Arts
 Lieutenant Governor's Award for Outstanding Service to Rural Saskatchewan
 Lieutenant Governor's Awards of Excellence
 Lieutenant Governor's Medal for the Regina Men's Bonspiel
 Lieutenant Governor's Oval Sled Dog Award
 Saskatchewan Lieutenant Governor's Greenwing Conservation Award
 Lieutenant Governor's Celebration of the Arts Pin

Territorial awards

Yukon
 Order of Polaris

Municipal awards
 Order of Montreal
 Order of Hamilton

See also
Orders, decorations, and medals of the Canadian provinces
Orders, decorations, and medals of Canada
Dufferin Medal

References

Find Canada's Scholarships

Awards
Lists of awards